The South Seberang Perai District (abbreviated "SPS") is a district in Penang, Malaysia. It covers an area of 242 square kilometres, and had a population of 184,007 at the 2020 Census. The district is bordered by Junjong River that separates Central Seberang Perai in the north, Kedah state border in the east, Perak state border in the south and the South Channel that separates Penang Island. Rivers that flow through South Seberang Perai are Junjong River, Jawi River and Kerian River. The capital of this district is Sungai Jawi and the largest town is Nibong Tebal. Other towns such as Batu Kawan, Bukit Tambun, Simpang Ampat, Sungai Bakap and Valdor are also located in this district. South Seberang Perai is thriving with the fishing industry and agriculture. Oil palm plantations covers most parts of the area.

Administrative divisions

SPS District is divided into 16 mukims.

Demographics

The following is based on Department of Statistics Malaysia 2020 census.

Federal Parliament and State Assembly Seats

List of South Seberang Perai district representatives in the Federal Parliament (Dewan Rakyat) 

List of South Seberang Perai district representatives in the State Legislative Assembly of Penang

Tourist attractions
 Aman Island

See also

 Districts of Malaysia

References

External links
 Development Summary in SPS District
Schools in SPS District